Farshad Mohammadi Mehr  is an Iranian midfielder who currently plays for Iranian football club Zob Ahan in the Persian Gulf Pro League.

Club career statistics

References

External links
Farshad Mohammadi Mehr at metafootball
Farshad Mohammadi Mehr at Soccerway 
Farshad Mohammadi Mehr on instagram 
Farshad Mohammadi Mehr  at PersianLeague.com  
Farshad Mohammadi Mehr  at footballcriticea 
PersianLeague.com  

1994 births
Living people
Giti Pasand players
Pars Jonoubi Jam players
Esteghlal F.C. players
Zob Ahan Esfahan F.C. players
Association football forwards
Iranian footballers